Jeffrey I. Gordon (born  1947) is a biologist and the Dr. Robert J. Glaser Distinguished University Professor and Director of the Center for Genome Sciences and Systems Biology at Washington University in St. Louis.  He is internationally known for his research on gastrointestinal development and how gut microbial communities affect normal intestinal function, shape various aspects of human physiology including our nutritional status, and affect predisposition to  diseases.  He is a member of the National Academy of Sciences, the American Academy of Arts and Sciences, the Institute of Medicine of the National Academies, and the American Philosophical Society.

Education and early career
Gordon received his bachelor's degree in Biology at 1969 at Oberlin College in Ohio. Over the next four years, Gordon received his medical training at the University of Chicago and graduated with honors in 1973.   After two years as intern and junior assistant resident in Medicine at Barnes Hospital, St Louis, Gordon joined the Laboratory of Biochemistry at the National Cancer Institute as a Research Associate in 1975.  He returned to Barnes Hospital in 1978 to become Senior Assistant Resident and then Chief Medical Resident at Washington University Medical Service. In 1981 he completed a fellowship in medicine (Gastroenterology) at Washington University School of Medicine.  In the following years, Gordon rose quickly through the academic ranks at Washington University: Asst. Prof. (1981–1984); Assoc. Prof. (1985–1987); Prof. (1987–1991) of Medicine and Biological Chemistry. In 1991, he became head of the Dept. Molecular Biology & Pharmacology (1991–2004). Gordon is currently the Director of the Center for Genome Sciences (2004–present) at Washington University in St. Louis.

Gordon's early career focused on the development of cell lineages within the gastrointestinal tract.  His laboratory initially combined the use of transgenic mouse models and biochemical approaches to elucidate the mechanisms of gut epithelial development along the duodenal-colonic and crypt-villus axes.  Early studies also provided important insight into biochemical properties of lipid handling and transport in the digestive system. Dr. Gordon and colleagues later combined laser capture microdissection, and functional genomics to characterize specified cell populations within the gastrointestinal tract, including multipotent stem cells.

Gordon played a pivotal role in the study of protein N-myristoylation, a co-translational modification by which a myristoyl group is covalently attached to an N-terminal glycine residue of a nascent polypeptide. Gordon and his colleagues were instrumental in characterizing the mechanism by which N-myristoyltransferase (the enzyme that catalyzes the myristoylation reaction) selects its substrates and its catalytic mechanism.

Gordon's group published a series of elegant studies that describe the ability of components of the commensal microbiota to induce specific responses in the host intestinal epithelium.   One of these responses, the induction of intestinal cell surface fucose residues, is elicited by a prominent human intestinal symbiont, Bacteroides thetaiotaomicron, which can harvest and use the host fucose as a carbon and energy source. Gordon's group published a seminal study in which functional genomics were used to document the genome-wide intestinal epithelial response to microbial colonization of the gastrointestinal tract. Dr. Gordon's laboratory has investigated epithelial cell interaction with human-associated pathogens, including uropathogenic Escherichia coli, Helicobacter pylori, and Listeria monocytogenes.

Present research
Gordon and his laboratory are currently focused on understanding the mutualistic interactions that occur between humans and the 10–100 trillion commensal microbes that colonize each person's gastrointestinal tract.   To tease apart the complex relationships that exist within this gut microbiota, Dr. Gordon's research program employs germ-free and gnotobiotic mice as model hosts, which may be colonized with defined, simplified microbial communities. These model intestinal microbiotas are more amenable to well-controlled experimentation.

Gordon has become an international pioneer in the study of gut microbial ecology and evolution, using innovative methods to interpret metagenomic and gut microbial genomic sequencing data.  In recent studies, Dr. Gordon's lab has established that the gut microbiota plays a role in host fat storage and obesity. Gordon and co-workers have used DNA pyrosequencing technology to perform metagenomics on the intestinal contents of obese mice, demonstrating that the gut microbiota of fat mice possess an enhanced capacity for aiding the host in harvesting energy from the diet A study of the microbial ecology of obese human subjects on two different weight loss diets indicate that the same principles may be operating in humans. His group has applied the sequencing of bacterial and archaeal genomes to describe the microbial functional genomic and metabolomic underpinnings of microbial adaptation to the gastrointestinal habitat. This approach has been extended to describe the role of the adaptive immune system in maintaining the host-microbial relationship.

Gordon is the lead author of an influential 2005 National Human Genome Research Institute white-paper entitled “Extending Our View of Self: the Human Gut Microbiome Initiative (HGMI)”.   In 2007 the Human Microbiome Project was listed on the NIH Roadmap for Medical Research as one of the New Pathways to Discovery.

Selected honors
 1973 M.D. with honors; Alpha Omega Alpha; Upjohn Achievement Award
 1989 Membership, Association of American Physicians
 1990 American Federation Clinical Research Young Investigator Award
 1990 NIDDK Young Scientist Award
 1992 Am. Gastroenterology Association Distinguished Achievement Award
 1992 Fellow, American Association for the Advancement of Science
 1991–1994 Distinguished Service Teaching Awards, Washington University School of Medicine
 1994 Marion Merrell Dow Distinguished Prize in Gastrointestinal Physiology
 1998 Wellcome Visiting Professor in the Basic Medical Sciences
 2001 Fellow, American Academy of Microbiology
 2001 Elected, National Academy of Sciences
 2002 Dr. Robert J. Glaser Distinguished University Professorship
 2003 Janssen Sustained Achievement Award in Digestive Sciences
 2003 Senior Scholar Award in Global Infectious Diseases, The Ellison Medical Foundation
 2004 Member, American Academy of Arts & Sciences
 2005 ASM Lecturer, American Society of Microbiology
 2008 Elected, Institute of Medicine, National Institute of Sciences
 2013 Selman A. Waksman Award in Microbiology
 2013 Robert Koch Prize
 2014 Passano Award
 2014 Elected, American Philosophical Society
 2014 Dickson Prize
 2014 Howard Taylor Ricketts Award
 2015 King Faisal International Prize in Medicine 
 2015 Keio Medical Science Prize
 2016 Steven C. Beering Award, Indiana University
 2017 Jacobaeus Prize, Novo Nordisk Foundation
 2017 Massry Prize
 2017 Louisa Gross Horwitz Prize
 2018 Copley Medal
 2018 BBVA Foundation Frontiers of Knowledge Award in Biology and Biomedicine
 2021 Balzan Prize for Microbiome in Health and Disease

References

External links
The Gordon Lab website

21st-century American biologists
1947 births
Living people
Oberlin College alumni
Members of the United States National Academy of Sciences
Place of birth missing (living people)
Members of the National Academy of Medicine
Fellows of the American Association for the Advancement of Science
Members of the American Philosophical Society
University of Chicago alumni
Washington University in St. Louis faculty
Washington University School of Medicine faculty
20th-century American biologists